Winchbottom is a hamlet in the parish of Little Marlow, in Buckinghamshire, England.

References

Hamlets in Buckinghamshire